Florida's 8th congressional district is an electoral district for the U.S. Congress and was reassigned in 2012, effective January 2013, from the inland central part of Florida to the central Atlantic coast. The district includes Titusville, Melbourne, Cocoa, and Cape Canaveral, Florida. The district includes all of Brevard County, as well as all of Indian River County and parts of Orange County. The district also includes the Kennedy Space Center.

Currently, the residents of the Eighth District are represented by Republican Bill Posey who has held the seat since 2013.

List of members representing the district

Recent results from presidential races

Election results

1992 election
Incumbent Republican Bill McCollum (68.5%) won over Democrat Chuck Kovaleski (31.5%). McCollum, who previous served in FL-5 since 1981, was shifted to the 8th District after the redistricting.

1994 election
Incumbent Republican Bill McCollum ran unopposed in the mid-terms. His re-election was part of the 1994 Republican Revolution.

1996 election
Incumbent Republican Bill McCollum (67.47%) won easily over progressive Democrat and actor Al Krulick (32.52%).

1998 election
Incumbent McCollum faced Krulick for the second time. McCollum won 66%-34%, a nearly identical margin from 1996. He won his seat for the tenth (and final) time. Despite some minor losses in the midterm for the GOP, McCollum was among the 15 Florida Republican incumbents who all won re-election.

2000 election
Twenty year veteran Republican incumbent Bill McCollum retired from the seat, to run (unsuccessfully) for the open Senate seat in Florida. The open seat in District 8 would be fought between former Orange County Commission Chairwoman Linda Chapin (Democrat) and attorney Ric Keller (Republican).

Keller endured a rough primary, which went to a runoff between himself and state representative Bill Sublette. Sublette had received the most votes in the September 5th primary (43.41%), but not enough to avoid a runoff. On October 3, Keller flipped the results, and won the two-man primary 51.94%-48.06%.

Chapin quickly raised over $1.4 million in campaign contributions, more than Sublette and Keller combined. In the general election, Chapin touted her public experience over Keller, who was political newcomer and a virtual unknown. Keller attacked Chapin as anti-gun rights, and for a record of fiscal irresponsibility. He famously cited her spending of $18,500 in county funds for a bronze sculpture of a frog.

Keller narrowly won the traditionally Republican-leaning district by a margin of 51% to 49%.

2002
After the 2001 Congressional re-apportionment, Florida's 8th District was redistricted from a near equal representation (Democrat-Republican) to one that included seven percent more Republicans than Democrats.

Keller readily won the 2002 Congressional election against Democrat Eddie Diaz, winning with 65% of the vote.

2004
In 2004 Keller won his third term with 60% of the vote against Democratic challenger Stephen Murray.

2006 election

In the 2006 election, Ric Keller was elected to his fourth two-year term, defeating Democrat Charlie Stuart, Independent Wes Hoaglund, and three write-in candidates.

Keller managed to hold on to his seat in the midst of a Democratic wave that was sweeping the country that November. Keller had been slipping in popularity, winning by lower margins in each election. He also had been mildly lampooned by local media with the nickname "Cheeseburger Ric," for introducing the so-called "Cheeseburger Bill" to the House floor in 2003 and again in 2005.

2008 election

Despite a prior pledge to serve only four terms, Congressman Ric Keller was running for his fifth term in the House of Representatives. Todd Long, a conservative Orlando attorney and radio talk show host, announced he would challenge Keller in the Republican primary, promising to make an issue of the broken term-limits pledge. The Keller-Long primary fight intensified over the summer, with Keller's term limit retraction, as well as his vote against The Surge making him increasingly vulnerable to defeat. However, just days before the August 26 primary, Keller sent out a mailer exposing Long's arrest record, a DUI, and another trespass warning. Keller won the primary with a 53%-47% margin, but his reputation took a hit, as many saw the mailer as a political "dirty trick."

Keller's Democratic opponent was attorney and progressive activist Alan Grayson, who emerged as the surprise victor of a large Democratic primary field which included moderate Democrat and long-time Central Florida political operative Charlie Stuart, attorney Mike Smith, engineer Alexander Fry, and recent law school graduate Quoc Van.

Grayson defeated Keller in the November general election receiving 52% of the vote, the same share as Barack Obama on the top of the ballot. Democratic activists in the district had mounted an aggressive campaign to register traditionally Democratic union workers and an increasing Hispanic (primarily Puerto Rican) demographic in the district. The general election was heated, with "mudslinging" and attack ads by both sides on television and in mailers. The race gained considerable national attention.

2010 election
Freshman Democratic incumbent Alan Grayson ran unopposed for the nomination, while the Republican side was won by former State Senate Majority Leader and Speaker of the Florida House of Representatives Daniel Webster. After less than two years in congress, Grayson had become known as a firebrand liberal and outspoken critic on the House floor, often to the point of controversy even from members of his own party. GOP leaders early on targeted Grayson and this district, which had traditionally leaned republican, for challenge in the mid-term election.

Daniel Webster had initially rejected the suggestions by the Florida GOP to run for the seat, but in April 2010, he changed his mind and entered the race. Webster's name recognition and endorsements from Jeb Bush and Mike Huckabee helped him emerge as the front-runner. Webster won the GOP primary on August 24, 2010, defeating six other candidates, with 40% of the vote.

In the general election, Webster ran a traditional, conservative family values-based campaign. However, Grayson had a deep war chest fueled by a nationwide campaign fundraising network. Grayson ran attack ads, calling Webster a "draft-dodger" (Webster had received student deferments and a draft classification as medically unfit for service), and another calling Webster "Taliban Dan" for his perceived extreme right religious views on social issues.

Grayson's attack ads were criticized, and observers suggest they ultimately backfired. With just days left before voters went to the polls, Grayson was considered increasingly vulnerable to defeat. On election day, Webster defeated Grayson soundly by an 18-point margin, part of a sweeping 63-seat gain by House Republicans in the midterm election.

2012 election

Previous incumbent Daniel Webster was redistricted to run instead for the 10th district. The "new" District 8 would comprise areas that formerly made up the 15th district.

Bill Posey, effectively running as the incumbent, won re-election with nearly 60% of the vote against Democratic nominee Shannon Roberts and non-partisan candidate Richard Gillmor.

2014 election

2016 election

2018 election

2020 election

2022 election

Historical district boundaries

From 1993 through 2012, the district was based inland within central Florida. It took in parts of Orange County (including Walt Disney World and most of Orlando), Lake County, Marion County and Osceola County.

In 2012, effective January 2013, the 8th district was reassigned to the Atlantic coast, with Brevard County and Indian River County, plus the east end of Orange County and Orlando.  It is geographically the successor to the old 15th district.

References

 Congressional Biographical Directory of the United States 1774–present

08
1953 establishments in Florida